Chinese General Hospital and Medical Center (CGHMC), also known as the Chinese General Hospital, is a district general hospital and teaching hospital in Manila, Philippines. It is one of the oldest hospitals in the Philippines, founded during the Spanish occupation of the country from donations of Chinese immigrants. The hospital's operations is supported by the Philippine Chinese Charitable Association (PCCA), founded in 1878 when the Chinese community was established in Manila.

History
Capitan Carlos Palanca Tanchueco, with wealthy Chinese businessmen Chan Guan and Mariano Velasco did a fund-raising in 1891 for the construction of a medical clinic where treatment was free of charge. Through funds coming from Chinese stores and special fees from Chinese people who arrived from China, the medical clinic expanded into a hospital. In 1893, it was named "Hospital de Chinos".

During the American colonization in 1898, Capitan Tanchueco became the first Chinese Acting Consul. Hospital de Chinos became inadequate for the swelling number of Chinese residents in Manila, Philippines. A fund raising campaign was done to construct the first Chinese General Hospital (CGH) with updated facilities in 1917.

One of the most noted doctors during his time, Dr. Jose Tee Han Kee became the first medical director and the new hospital was inaugurated in 1921. He also served as consultant for the Philippine Health Service because of his expertise in the bubonic plague. Also in the same year when the Chinese General Hospital School of Nursing was also founded.

The hospital's operation was affected during World War II. Directors and those with higher positions in the hospital became political prisoners of war, followed by mass evacuation. To keep the hospital functioning, the principal, chief nurse, some graduate and some student nurses, two junior resident physicians, and some male helpers was made part of a skeleton staff. In 1945, more than five hundred victims of shrapnel and bullets were admitted to the Chinese General Hospital, even occupying all available spaces in the corridors.

Antonio Nubia was installed as director with  Manuel Chua-Chiaco Sr. as assistant director after World War II. The hospital was immediately reconstructed in 1946 through the help of Chinese communities. In 1948, the Charity Pavilion was constructed across the main building.

The hospital was refurbished in 1950. The hospital also catered training and teaching, as approved by Pedro Mayuga, former Director of the Philippine Bureau of Medical Services of the Department of Health. Luis Guerrero, Antonio G. Sison, Jose Albert, Florencio Quintos, Rosendo R. Llamas, and Fortunato Guerrero were the consultants of the hospital.

More improvements happened from the 1950s onward. Guillermo A. CuUnjieng Sr. Chest Pavilion was inaugurated 1953 by her daughter Sr. Esperanza Ma. A. CuUnjieng and prominent philanthropists. In 1957, Cheng Tsai Jun Memorial 100-bed Charity Wards were established. Two years later, Chinese General Hospital and Medical Center had another facelift. A bigger Emergency Building with three stories was constructed in 1971. The School of Nursing Building with six stories was completed in 1975. And in 1983, a six-storey annex to the Main Building was built.

Kasian Lim was appointed new director and James G. Dy as president of the Philippine Chinese Charitable Association in 1990s. Every department was expanded and computerization and updating of medical equipment and appliances happened. In 1996, the Heart Institute was built with renowned cardiologist Dy Bun Yok as Director and Manual Chua-Chiaco Jr. as the Chief in Cardiovascular Surgery.

The present director CGHMC is James Dy. In 2014, the hospital renewed a Memorandum of Agreement (MOA) with the Intelligence Service of the Armed Forces of the Philippines (ISAFP) assuring its personnel of free medical care at the CGHMC in the event they get injured while performing their duty. The Philippine National Police (PNP) and the National Bureau of Investigation (NBI) also have the same MOAs with the hospital.

See also
Other Chinese hospitals and health care serving local Chinese communities:
 San Francisco Chinese Hospital
 Montreal Chinese Hospital
 Yee Hong Centre for Geriatric Care - Greater Toronto Area

References

Hospitals in Manila
Buildings and structures in Santa Cruz, Manila
Hospital buildings completed in 1917
Hospital buildings completed in 1967
Hospital buildings completed in 1969